The Grand Prix Justiniano Hotels is an annual professional road bicycle race for women in Turkey.

Winners

References

Cycle races in Turkey
Recurring sporting events established in 2019
Women's road bicycle races
Annual sporting events in Turkey